KQBU (920 kHz) is an AM radio station licensed to serve El Paso, Texas, United States. The station is owned by 97.5 Licensee TX, LLC, an American subsidiary of Grupo Radio Centro (GRC).

History
KWBU received its first license, as KELP, and signed on in 1947 as a 1,000 watt daytime-only station. After ownership by Paso Broadcasting Company and Trinity Broadcasting Corporation, it was sold to Gordon McLendon in 1954. McLendon added a couple of transmission towers in order to add night authority with 500 watts power, as well as to add an antenna for a new TV station, KILT. The old tower site was 4530 Delta Drive on the property used for the city of El Paso sewage treatment plant.

In 1957, KELP and its TV station were sold to KELP Radio Corporation, which changed the TV station's calls to KELP-TV. Sales of KELP-AM-TV to Northern Pacific Radio Corporation (in 1961) and John B. Walton (in 1966), and of the AM station to Clear Channel Communications (in 1977), followed.

On August 20, 1982, KELP became KYSR. In 1987 the station became KBNA, marking its first Spanish-language format.

The station was relocated to its current site in 1989-1990 by then-station engineer David Stewart and then-director of Engineering Marvin Fiedler. The phasing equipment was designed by Harry Seabrooke at Silliman and Silliman, and built by Fiedler and Stewart.

Expanded Band assignment
On March 17, 1997, the Federal Communications Commission (FCC) announced that eighty-eight stations had been given permission to move to newly available "Expanded Band" transmitting frequencies, ranging from 1610 to 1700 kHz, with KBNA authorized to move from 920 to 1680 kHz. However, the station never procured the Construction Permit needed to implement the authorization, so the expanded band station was never built.

Later history
Univision Radio would come into owning KBNA as well as KBNA-FM 97.5 and KAMA on 750 AM. In January 2009, Univision partnered with El Paso Media Group to provide an English language morning talk radio format, known as TalkBack Radio. Infighting between competing factions resulted in a host lineup change in early April 2009 and Univision canceling the talk radio format on April 15, 2009.

The station was assigned the KQBU call sign on December 11, 2007. By 2016, KQBU was airing national programs from the Univisión América talk network.

In 2016, Univision Radio exited El Paso by selling its stations to affiliates of Mexican radio broadcaster Grupo Radio Centro for $2 million, with GRC taking over operations via LMA on November 8. Rafael Márquez, a United States citizen, owns 75 percent of the licensee, 97.5 Licensee TX, LLC, with the remainder being owned by Grupo Radio Centro TX, LLC. Under GRC ownership, KQBU has been a simulcast of KBNA-FM.

On September 13, 2018, KQBU dropped the KBNA-FM simulcast and changed their format to sports, branded as "Lone Star Sports 920".

On September 19, 2022, KQBU ceased operations.

References

External links

FCC History Cards for KQBU (covering 1946-1980 as KELP)
KQBU TalkBack Radio launch announcement
Radio shenanigans over

QBU
El Paso County, Texas
Grupo Radio Centro
Radio stations established in 1947
1947 establishments in Texas